The Men's 69 kilograms weightlifting event at the 2012 Summer Olympics in London, United Kingdom, took place at ExCeL London on 31 July 2012.

Summary
Total score was the sum of the lifter's best result in each of the snatch and the clean and jerk, with three lifts allowed for each lift.  In case of a tie, the lighter lifter won; if still tied, the lifter who took the fewest attempts to achieve the total score won.  Lifters without a valid snatch score did not perform the clean and jerk.

On 25 November 2020 Răzvan Martin of Romania, who had originally been the bronze medalist, was disqualified after a retest of his sample tested positive for doping.

Schedule
All times are British Summer Time (UTC+01:00)

Records

Results

References 

Weightlifting at the 2012 Summer Olympics
Men's events at the 2012 Summer Olympics